Clinker (born Gary James Joynes) is a Canadian sound artist, composer, and visual artist from Edmonton, Alberta. Recent work includes the live cinema piece On the Other Side... (for L. Cohen), commissioned by the 2008 Leonard Cohen International Festival in Edmonton, Alberta as well as the soundtrack for the documentary Dirt.

He is fascinated by the sources of electronic composition and the ever-evolving language of technology; objects and mechanisms stimulate his process. As Clinker, his work explores meditative spaces and the kinesthetic and synesthetic effects of sound and visuals.

Recent work includes "On the Other Side..." a Live Cinema piece commissioned by the 2008 International Leonard Cohen Festival. A film score for the National Film Board of Canada's award-winning feature documentary "DIRT" was composed by Clinker and premiered at the Vancouver Doxa Festival in May 2008. His 2007 Live Cinema performance work "Provody" was selected to open the Mutek Festival 8TH. edition in Montreal.

Clinker's latest audio work entitled "On the Other Side... (for L.Cohen)" was released to critical acclaim on the Los Angeles Sound Art Label, Dragon's Eye Recordings, in January 2009. Through the Fall/Winter of 2009 Clinker was an artist in residence at the Banff Centre of the Arts (BNMI) advancing new ideas in visual music for future audio-visual sculptural installations.

Recent performances include Roulette Mixology Festival (New York), High Performance Rodeo 2010 (Calgary), (((Soundwave))) (Vancouver Island), Mutek_10 (Montreal), Mutek_10 TOUR (Edmonton), Emmedia Sonic Boom 2009 (Calgary), Banff Centre - BNMI Interactive Screen (2008 & 2007 editions) and the 2008 Leanord Cohen International Festival.

The last few years have seen Clinker's work performed and exhibited in Canada and abroad in festivals including Tanzstartklar Festival 2008 (Graz, Austria), New Forms Festival 2007 & 2003 (Vancouver), Sprawl - Interplay_4 Festival 2007 (Amsterdam, Dublin, London, Bristol), Sea of Sound Festival 2005 (The Works - Edmonton), Mutek Le Placard Festival 2005 (Montreal), Standart 2003 (Madrid, Spain). In May 2003 Clinker made his premiere outside his native Alberta at the 2003 Mutek Festival.

Sources

External links
Official web site, clinkersound.com

"The Artists", Sea of Sound - Edmonton Interactive Arts Festival.
Clinker at the Montreal Mutek Festival
"Frequency Painting: 12 Tones Editions"
"Frequency Painting - Gary James Joynes Interview"
Latitude 53's 2011 gallery note: "Frequency Painting: 12 Tones"
Exhibition: "Frequency Painting: 12 Tones"

Canadian male composers
Canadian sound artists
Living people
Artists from Edmonton
Musicians from Edmonton
Year of birth missing (living people)